Sir Albert Edward Bowen, 1st Baronet (November 1858 – 19 September 1924) was an English businessman who spent much of his life in Argentina.

Early life
Bowen was born in Hanley, Staffordshire. His family emigrated to Canada when he was a boy and he was educated at Upper Canada College in Toronto.

Career
At the age of twenty-one, he moved to Buenos Aires, Argentina, and entered business, rapidly becoming successful and wealthy.

In 1895, he returned to England, intending to retire and enjoy his fortune. However, he soon returned to work, joining the board of Wilson, Sons & Co, coal merchants. He took more directorships, until he sat on the board of eight companies, most of them associated with Argentina, including the Buenos Aires Great Southern Railway and the Buenos Aires Western Railway. He joined the board of the Buenos Aires Great Southern Railway in 1908 and became chairman in 1916, holding the post until his death. He continued to pay periodical visits to Argentina, where his great knowledge of the country and fluency in Spanish were great assets to his companies. He was attributed with the construction of the Buenos Aires/Chile railway line over the Andes.

He was high sheriff of Bedfordshire in 1910–1911. During the First World War he served on many government committees.

For his many services to his country and to business, Bowen was created a baronet in the 1921 New Year Honours.

Personal life
On 24 April 1884, Bowen married Alice Anita Crowther. They had five children: Winifred Ada Bowen, Gertrude Dorothy Bowen, Evelyn Constance Bowen, Major Sir Edward Crowther Bowen, 2nd Baronet, and Harold Cedric Bowen. Their eldest daughter, Winifred, married Alexander Cobbe, an officer in the Indian Army and a recipient of the Victoria Cross. Their second daughter, Gertrude, married the diplomat Sir Kinahan Cornwallis.

See also
 Bowen baronets

Footnotes

References
Obituary, The Times, 20 September 1924

1858 births
1924 deaths
People from Hanley, Staffordshire
English emigrants to Canada
English businesspeople
Baronets in the Baronetage of the United Kingdom
Argentine people in rail transport
British people in rail transport
High Sheriffs of Bedfordshire